Gigantometra is a monotypic genus of water-strider bugs, containing the species Gigantometra gigas: its name indicating that it is the largest species in its family Gerridae.  It has been found in pools of fast-flowing, subtropical and tropical forest streams, on Hainan Island and highland northern Vietnam.

Description
Gigantometra gigas is the largest species of water-striders, with legs having a span of about 300 mm in order to spread its relatively large body weight on the water surface.  Sexual dimorphism is common throughout the Gerridae and sexual selection of males for large body size has been demonstrated in several species, including this one: where males are larger than females in all measured traits. This dimorphism was prominent in the leg parts, which are 10–50% longer in males than in females; males are generally more variable in size than females, especially with leg segments.  It was proposed that sexual selection acts on the length of middle legs in males and explains both the increase and variance in middle leg length, with hind leg length similarly correlated.

References

External Links

 Gerridae
Gerromorpha genera
Hemiptera of Asia